Sagar district is a district of Madhya Pradesh state in central India. The town of Sagar serves as its administrative center.

The district has an area of 10,252 km², and a population of 2,378,458 (2011 census), an increase of 45% or by 732,260 inhabitants from its 1991 population of 1,646,198. Sagar district is dominated by Sonis, Jains and Yadavs.

As of 2011, it is the third most populous district of Madhya Pradesh, after Indore and Jabalpur.

The tropic of cancer passes through Sagar district.

History
The history of the town of Sagar dates back to about 1660 AD, when Udan Shah, a descendant of Nihal Shah, built a small fort where the present one sits and founded a village close to it called Parkota Sagar. The present fort and a settlement under its walls was founded by Govind Pant Bundele, an officer of the Peshwa Bajirao I, who controlled Sagar and the surrounding territory after 1735 when it came under the Peshwa's possession.
In 1818, the greater part of the district was ceded by the Peshwa Baji Rao II to the British Government, while the remainder of the present district of Sagar came into the possession of the British between 1818 and 1860. Thereafter in 1861, the Saugor and Nerbudda territories (along with the Nagpur state) formed a Commissioner's Province called Central Provinces.
Sagar was the headquarters of the Sagar Commissionership for a short period until 1863-64 when this district was incorporated with Jabalpur Commissionership. In the year 1932, the district of Damoh was added to Sagar district and was administrated as Sub-Division. In 1956, however, Damoh Sub-Division was again separated from the district to form a separate district and Sagar district consisted of four tehsils viz, Sagar, Khurai, Rehli, Banda.

Demographics

According to the 2011 census, Sagar District has a population of 2,378,458, roughly equal to the nation of Latvia or the U.S. state of New Mexico. This gives it a ranking of 188th in India (out of a total of 640). Its population growth rate over the decade 2001–2011 was 17.62%. Sagar has a sex ratio of 896 females for every 1000 males, and a literacy rate of 77.52%. 29.80% of the population lives in urban areas. Scheduled Castes and Tribes made up 21.09% and 9.33% of the population respectively.

At the time of the 2011 Census of India, 55.38% of the population in the district spoke Hindi and 42.93% Bundeli as their first language.

Culture

Places of interest

Dayasagar Ji Mararaj Nemingar Jain Tirth
 
Neminagar Jain Tirth is in Banda tehsil located 30 km from Sagar on National Highway NH-86. It was built in the name of Aacharya Shri 108 Nemisagar ji maharaj by the blessings of his disciple aacharya 108 shri dayasagar ji maharaj. This temple has one choubisi (24 tirthankars god on 24 different altars), one levitated trikal choubisi (Lords of time passes, the time now and time to be), and a navagraha mandir (Lords of nine planets).

Shri Parsvanath Digamber Jain Atishaya Kshetra, Pateria
Shri Parsvanath Digamber Jain Atishaya Kshetra, Pateriaji is a 232-year-old temple dedicated to Parshvantha. This idol is 7 feet in height in Padmasana posture built in Black Stone with three serpent hoods. This temple was built by Seth Radha Kishanjun Shah with the earnings of one day in the business of Cotton in 1782 (V.S. 1839).

Makronia, Sagar
A former Dr H. S. Gour University started from Makronia's SAF Campus so many historic events are connected through Makronia. This region is developing as the suburban region near Sagar City. It is just 5 km away from the city. It has its separate railway station, the biggest hotel in Sagar, the Paradise Hotel, many CBSE and MP board schools, as well as a government engineering college. Many army bases are located in Makronia.
Also Makronia Nagar Palika, there are many Engineering Colleges in Makronia, as there is a shortage of space in the City, development is moving towards the Makronia Region.

Notable people
 
 
 Sir Hari Singh Gour – founder of Dr. Hari Singh Gour University, a lawyer, jurist, educationalist, social reformer, writer and member of the Constitutional Assembly
 Govind Namdev - director.
 Vitthalbhai Patel – poet, lyricist, former government minister, and social worker.
 Nathuram Premi (1881–1960) - writer, publisher, poet, editor, linguist and, intellectual in the field of Jainism and Hindi literature; born in the city of Deori
 Govind Singh Rajput, Indian politician
 Ravishankar Shukla (2 August 1877 – 31 December 1956) – born in Sagar, first Chief Minister of Madhya Pradesh state.
 Mukesh Tiwari - actor.
 Harsh Yadav - Indian politician
 Laxmi Narayan Yadav, Indian politician

See also
Karrapur
Lajpatpura

References

External links

 Official site of Sagar district
 Official website of the Zila Panchayat of Sagar

 
Districts of Madhya Pradesh